Roberto Castillo (1950–2008) was a Honduran philosopher and writer.

A 2002 novel by Roberto Castillo, La guerra mortal de los sentidos, chronicles the adventures of the "Searcher for the Lenca Language."

References 

Honduran short story writers
Honduran male writers
Male short story writers
Honduran academics
1950 births
2008 deaths
Honduran philosophers
20th-century Honduran writers
Honduran novelists
21st-century Honduran writers
20th-century Honduran philosophers
20th-century short story writers
20th-century male writers
21st-century philosophers
21st-century novelists
21st-century male writers
Male novelists